My Way Home is a 1965 Hungarian drama film directed by Miklós Jancsó.

References

External links

1965 films
1965 drama films
1960s Hungarian-language films
Films directed by Miklós Jancsó
Hungarian drama films